Shell Cottage may refer to:
 a fictional place in Harry Potter
 the "shell cottage" or "cliff cottage" in Cullenstown, Ireland
 Shell Cottage, in the grounds of Carton House, Maynooth, Ireland
 Shell Cottage, Bucklesham, England
 Shell Cottage, in the grounds of Adlington Hall, England
 Shell Cottage, in the grounds of Château de Rambouillet, France, a monument protected by Centre des monuments nationaux
 Shell Cottage, a listed building in Aberlady, East Lothian, Scotland
 Shell Cottage, Shell, Himbleton, a Grade II* listed building in Wychavon, England